Bror Lagercrantz (28 September 1894 – 22 January 1981) was a Swedish fencer. He competed in the individual épée at the 1924 Summer Olympics.

References

External links
 

1894 births
1981 deaths
Swedish male épée fencers
Olympic fencers of Sweden
Fencers at the 1924 Summer Olympics
Sportspeople from Stockholm
20th-century Swedish people